SFPA may stand for

the Science Fiction Poetry Association
the Scottish Fisheries Protection Agency
the Student Free Press Association
Saint Francis University, located in Pennsylvania; abbreviation used to distinguish it from Saint Francis College, located in New York.